Deduleşti may refer to several villages in Romania:

 Deduleşti, a village in Morărești Commune, Argeș County
 Deduleşti, a village in Mircea Vodă, Brăila
 Deduleşti, a village in Topliceni Commune, Buzău County